Atrophaneura dixoni is a species of butterfly from the family Papilionidae that is found in northern and central Sulawesi, Indonesia.

The wingspan is 130–150 mm. The wings are black. The underside of the hindwings have red patches which are more numerous in females than males. The wing veins are bordered in white.

Status
Uncommon or rare. Localised.

Etymology

References

External links
 
Butterflycorner  Images from Naturhistorisches Museum Wien includes macro photos

Butterflies described in 1900
Atrophaneura
Butterflies of Indonesia
Taxa named by Henley Grose-Smith